Saint-Roch is the main railway station in Montpellier, France. The station was formerly known as Gare de Montpellier, but since March 2005 it has been named after Saint Roch, a native of the city who was born in the 14th century. Saint-Roch is one of the principal transport hubs of Languedoc-Roussillon, situated between the stations of Nîmes and Sète.

The station building comprises a listed front face and a passenger building laid out on three levels. What was the bus station above the tracks is now a short-stay car park. Since the beginning of the 2000s, the station has been in the middle of an urban regeneration project involving old railway property called the Nouveau Saint-Roch.

Until December 2013, there was a EuroCity service between Montpellier, Barcelona and Cartagena in Spain. This service was cut when high-speed services were extended to Barcelona and Madrid.

Destinations
Due to its position in the south of France and on the lines from Paris and Spain, many international trains stop in Montpellier.

From Montpellier train services depart to major French cities such as: Paris, Lyon, Marseille, Perpignan, Lille, Dijon, Toulouse, Bordeaux and Besançon.

International services operate to Spain: Barcelona and Madrid.

Train services
The station is served by the following services:

High speed services (TGV)
Paris–Valence–Nîmes–Montpellier (– Béziers)
Paris–Lyon–Nîmes–Montpellier–Béziers–Narbonne–Perpignan
Paris–Valence–Nîmes–Montpellier–Béziers–Perpignan–Barcelona
Lyon–Nîmes–Montpellier–Perpignan–Barcelona
Lille–Paris-CDG Airport–Lyon–Nîmes–Montpellier
Lyon–Nîmes–Montpellier–Toulouse
High speed services (AVE)
Marseille–Nîmes–Montpellier–Béziers–Perpignan–Barcelona–Saragosse–Madrid
High speed services (TGV Ouigo)
Marne-la-Vallée–Lyon Saint-Exupéry–Nîmes–Montpellier
Intercity services (Intercités)
Bordeaux–Toulouse–Montpellier–Nîmes–Marseille
Regional services (TER Occitanie)
Narbonne–Béziers–Montpellier–Nîmes–Avignon
Cerbère–Perpignan–Narbonne–Montpellier–Nîmes–Avignon
Narbonne–Montpellier–Nîmes–Arles–Marseille

See also
 List of SNCF stations in Occitanie

References

External links 

 

Railway stations in Hérault
Buildings and structures in Montpellier
Railway stations in France opened in 1839